This page shows the results of the triathlon competition at the 2006 Central American and Caribbean Games, held on July 28, 2006 in Cartagena, Colombia.

Medal summary

Men's events

Women's events

Men's competition

Legend: DNF - Did not finish

Women's competition

Legend: DNF - Did not finish

References

Results
 

2006 Central American and Caribbean Games
Central American and Caribbean Games
2006